The 1967 NBA All-Star Game was the 17th All-Star Game played January 10, 1967, at the Cow Palace in Daly City, California. The coaches were Red Auerbach, Boston Celtics (Eastern Conference) and Fred Schaus, Los Angeles Lakers (Western Conference). The Western Conference All-Stars defeated the heavily favored Eastern Conference All-Stars, 135–120, widely acknowledged to be the greatest upset in the history of the event. 

San Francisco Warriors second-second sensation Rick Barry was selected the Most Valuable Player on the strength of 38 points on 16-of-27 in the field. He also contributed six rebounds and three assists in 34 minutes. 

The game also saw the ejection of Eastern Conference head coach Red Auerbach in what would be his final NBA season on the bench. He became the only coach to be ejected in an All-Star Game.

Eastern Conference

Western Conference

Score by Periods
 

Officials: Willie Smith and Earl Strom
Attendance: 13,972

References

External links
 1967 NBA All Star Game Box Score

National Basketball Association All-Star Game
All-Star
Basketball competitions in California
1967 in sports in California
1960s in San Francisco
Daly City, California